Uldale is a small village and former civil parish in Cumbria, England. The Uldale Fells are in the vicinity, and to the southeast are Chapelhouse Reservoir and Over Water. It is located just inside the Lake District National Park. In 1931 the parish had a population of 217.

Uldale has a place in literature as the occasional home of Judith Paris, a heroine of the Herries Chronicles, the saga of a Cumbrian family written by Hugh Walpole in the 1930s.

Buildings
St. James' Church (the "old church") is located  outside Uldale, yet only  from Ireby.  It has a Grade II listing. A school was founded in 1726 on the current site of Dale House, but later moved to a larger building funded by the Cape family and many local famIlies.

The Old Church of England School was built in 1895 and served as the village School for over 100 years until closure in the 1990s.  The building was set for demolition but was saved in 2010 when it was transformed into a tea room + gallery.

Governance
Uldale is part of the parliamentary constituency of Workington. In the December 2019 general election, the Tory candidate for Workington, Mark Jenkinson, was elected the MP, overturning a 9.4 per cent Labour majority from the 2017 election to eject shadow environment secretary Sue Hayman by a margin of 4,136 votes. Until the December 2019 general election The Labour Party has won the seat in the constituency in every general election since 1979.The Conservative Party has only been elected once in Workington since World War II, at the 1976 by-election.

Before Brexit, its residents were covered by the North West England European Parliamentary Constituency.

For Local Government purposes it is in the Boltons  Ward of Allerdale Borough Council  and the Bothel and Wharrels Ward of Cumbria County Council.

The village forms part of the civil parish of Ireby and Uldale and has its own Parish Council along with Ireby,  Ireby and Uldale Parish Council.

On 1 April 1934 the parish was abolished to form Ireby.

Notable people
 Jonathan Cape

See also

 Listed buildings in Ireby and Uldale
 Little Cockup
 Chapelhouse Reservoir

References

External links
 Cumbria County History Trust: Uldale (nb: provisional research only – see Talk page)
 Uldale - St James' Church at Visit Cumbria

Villages in Cumbria
Former civil parishes in Cumbria
Allerdale